Disney Christmas Story is an American Disney comic strip that appeared each year in the weeks before Christmas, beginning in 1960. The strip ran Monday to Saturday for the three to four weeks leading up to Christmas Eve, and often promoted the latest Disney release or re-release. The strips were usually not published on the newspaper's comics page; they appeared at the bottom of the page somewhere else in the paper, so that the reader would have to hunt for it, and not-coincidentally pass by some of the Christmas advertising. The strip appeared every year until 1987.

In 2017, the Christmas stories were collected in a hardback volume, Disney's Christmas Classics, published by IDW Publishing. The collection includes all of the Christmas stories except for 1986's story based on Song of the South.

Development
Unlike most Disney comic strips, Disney Christmas Story actively mixed characters from different Disney films—for example, in 1962, Ludwig Von Drake saved Princess Aurora from Maleficent's spell, and in 1976, the Seven Dwarfs and Pinocchio helped Santa Claus foil an evil plot hatched by Captain Hook, the Big Bad Wolf and Honest John to steal his toys and hold them for ransom. The 1963 sequence was the only comic strip appearance of the popular Disney comics character Li'l Bad Wolf, and the 1971 story features a rare comic-strip appearance by the Beagle Boys.

The strip was written by Frank Reilly from its inception in 1960 until 1975, and then by Carl Fallberg from 1976 to 1984. Floyd Norman wrote the 1985 and 1986 sequences, and Fallberg wrote the last story in 1987.

When Norman was given the assignment to write the Christmas Story in 1985, he was bothered by the way that the stories mixed up characters from different films. He recalled in a 2013 blog post, "I couldn't help but find this approach somewhat bizarre. Mickey and Pluto didn't fit in the same world as Dumbo and the seven dwarfs certainly didn't mix well with Jaq and Gus Gus from Cinderella. I decided if I was going to write a holiday story the characters used would have to be consistent... No more of this wacky 'mix and match' approach to Disney storytelling." Norman's first story featured only characters from One Hundred and One Dalmatians, and his second characters from Song of the South.

In 1992, the strip returned as Disney Holiday Story, telling more straightforward tales starring the characters from the most recent Disney animated release. This strip lasted for six years, until 1997. All six storylines were written by Floyd Norman (with Karen Kreider on the first year), and illustrated by Richard Moore.

Disney Christmas Story

Disney Holiday Story

The tradition was revived in 1992 to publicize contemporary Disney feature animated films. All six storylines were written by Floyd Norman (with Karen Kreider on the first year), and illustrated by Richard Moore. These stories only included the cast of the featured movie; there were no special crossovers with other characters.

 1992: Beauty and the Beast (Nov 30-Dec 25)
 1993: Aladdin (Nov 29-Dec 24)
 1994: The Lion King (Nov 28-Dec 24)
 1995: Pocahontas (Nov 27-Dec 23)
 1996: Hunchback of Notre Dame (Dec 2-28)
 1997: The Little Mermaid (Dec 1-27, for the film's re-release)

References

External links
 Disney Christmas Story at the INDUCKS

1960 comics debuts
1987 comics endings
1992 comics debuts
1997 comics endings
American comic strips
Christmas comics
Disney comic strips